George Lovell Banks (October 13, 1839 - August 20, 1924) was an American soldier who received the Medal of Honor for valor during the American Civil War.

Biography
Banks joined the 15th Indiana Infantry Regiment in June 1861, and mustered out three years later. He received the Medal of Honor on February 18, 1891, for his actions at the Battle of Missionary Ridge.

He died at his home in Independence, Kansas, on August 20, 1924.

Medal of Honor citation
Citation:

As color bearer, led his regiment in the assault, and, though wounded, carried the flag forward to the enemy's works, where he was again wounded. In a brigade of 8 regiments this flag was the first planted on the parapet.

See also

List of American Civil War Medal of Honor recipients: A-F

References

External links

Military Times

1839 births
1924 deaths
Union Army soldiers
United States Army Medal of Honor recipients
People from Lake County, Ohio
People of Ohio in the American Civil War
American Civil War recipients of the Medal of Honor